Monterey is a historic home located near Odessa, New Castle County, Delaware.  It was built about 1850, and is a two-story, five bay brick house with an original ell to the rear and a frame, two-story addition to the extreme rear.  It is of full Georgian plan - center hall, double pile and in the Greek Revival style. It has a one-bay entrance portico with a flat-roof and balustraded parapet.  Also on the property are a contributing smokehouse, carriage house, ice house, granary, and frame octagonal privy.

It was listed on the National Register of Historic Places in 1980.

References

External links

Houses on the National Register of Historic Places in Delaware
Georgian architecture in Delaware
Greek Revival houses in Delaware
Houses completed in 1850
Houses in New Castle County, Delaware
Historic American Buildings Survey in Delaware
National Register of Historic Places in New Castle County, Delaware